The Yt antigen system (also known as Cartwright) is present on the membrane of red blood cells and helps determine a person's blood type. The antigens are found on the protein acetylcholinesterase, an enzyme which helps break down acetylcholine. The Yt system features two alleles, Yt(a) and Yt(b). Antibodies against the Yt system can lead to transfusion reactions such as hemolytic anemia.

References 

 - OMIM page on Yt antigen

External links 
 Yt at BGMUT Blood Group Antigen Gene Mutation Database at NCBI, NIH

Blood antigen systems
Genes on human chromosome 7
Transfusion medicine